Frank Palmer Speare (1869 – May 28, 1954) was the first president of Northeastern University, serving from 1898 to 1940. He began the evening program at the Boston YMCA that later became Northeastern. As founding president, he oversaw the launching of the university's evening law school, the now-defunct automobile school, the evening polytechnic schools, the school of commerce and finance, and the co-operative engineering school.

In addition to being an educator, he was also a sailor, farmer, and music enthusiast. He composed songs ("Silver Bay, a Song of Vacation Days") and other music (the "Northeastern March"), plays (Mystic Waters, or The Spirit of Winnipesaukee), and musicals.

Notes

External links
 Frank Palmer Speare: Educational Visionary. Parr, Jessica. the online edition of a Northeastern University Libraries exhibition. Boston: Northeastern University Libraries, Archives and Special Collections, 2004. Contains numerous photographs plus biographical information.
 The Frank Palmer Speare papers, 1896-1951 are located in the Northeastern University Libraries, Archives and Special Collections Department, Boston, MA.

1869 births
1954 deaths
People from Boston
Bridgewater State University alumni
Presidents of Northeastern University